Miroslav Singer (born 14 May 1968, Prague) is a Czech economist who served as the third governor of the Czech National Bank from 2010 to 2016. He received his PhD in economics from the University of Pittsburgh in 1995.

See also 
Czech National Bank

References 

1968 births
Living people
Governors of the Czech National Bank
20th-century Czech economists
Prague University of Economics and Business alumni
People from Prague
University of Pittsburgh alumni
21st-century Czech economists